Chazeray Dijon "Chaz" Schilens (born Chazeray Dijon Simmons; November 7, 1985) is a former American football wide receiver. He was drafted by the Oakland Raiders in the seventh round of the 2008 NFL Draft.  He played high school football at Highland High School in Gilbert, Arizona, and college football at San Diego State.

Professional career

Pre-draft

Oakland Raiders
Entering Week 9 of the 2008 campaign, Schilens was named a starter, playing opposite Javon Walker.  Schilens was also a factor in the outside blocking game, adding extra yardage on running plays with key blocks. In week 16, Schilens had his best game as a Raider, catching three passes for 52 yards including a 20-yard touchdown. He finished the 2008 campaign with 15 catches for 226 yards and two touchdowns.

Chaz broke the fifth metatarsal bone in his left foot in August, 2009, but returned to action midway through the season and caught the game-winning touchdown in an upset in Week 15 over the rival Denver Broncos.

In 2010, Schilens had another injury-plagued campaign, playing in only five games and catching five passes total.

New York Jets

Schilens was signed by the New York Jets on March 16, 2012. In Schilens' first game as a Jet, he caught one pass for 8 yards from Mark Sanchez. The Jets went on to win 48-28 over division rival Buffalo Bills.

Detroit Lions
Schilens was signed by the Detroit Lions on July 24, 2013. Schilens was released on August 23, 2013.

Saskatchewan Roughriders 
On March 4, 2014 Schilens agreed to terms with the Saskatchewan Roughriders of the Canadian Football League.

References

External links
Saskatchewan Roughriders bio 
San Diego State Aztecs bio
Oakland Raiders bio

1985 births
Living people
Sportspeople from Los Angeles County, California
American football wide receivers
San Diego State Aztecs football players
Oakland Raiders players
People from Lancaster, California
New York Jets players
Detroit Lions players
Players of American football from California
Saskatchewan Roughriders players
American players of Canadian football